Jan Wenceslaus Speerger (29 April 1896 – 25 June 1950) was a Czech film actor and film director. He appeared in many Czech movies in the first half of the 20th century.

Life
He started as a cinema projectionist and later worked as a technician and assistant director for Wetebfilm. He acted mostly in supporting roles and also directed three films. He was also a stage actor in Vinohrady Theatre, National Theatre and others.

Selected filmography

Actor
 The Arrival from the Darkness (1921)
 The Cross by the Brook (1921)
 Jánošík (1921)
 White Paradise (1924)
 The Lantern (1925)
 Never the Twain (1926)
 St. Wenceslas (1929)
 Poor Girl (1929)
 Imperial and Royal Field Marshal (1930)
 Him and His Sister (1931)
 The Good Soldier Schweik (1931)
 Sister Angelika (1932)
 Anton Spelec, Sharp-Shooter (1932)
 The Undertaker (1932)
 The Ideal Schoolmaster (1932)
 The Inspector General (1933)
 The Heroic Captain Korkorán (1934)
 Jánošík (1935)
 Three Men in the Snow (1936)
 Irca's Romance (1936)
 Virginity (1937)
 Cause for Divorce (1937)
 Tři vejce do skla (1937)
 The Lantern (1938)
 Girl In Blue (1940)
 Baron Prášil (1940)
 Nocturnal Butterfly (1941)
 Valentin the Good (1942)
 I'll Be Right Over (1942)
 Řeka čaruje (1945)
 Rozina, the Love Child (1945)
 Čapek's Tales (1947)
 The Poacher's Foster Daughter or Noble Millionaire (1949)
 Divá Bára (1949)

Director
 The Tramp's Heart (1922)
 Lost Souls (1926)
 Gypsy Love (1938)

References

External links
 

1896 births
1950 deaths
Czech male film actors
Czech male silent film actors
Czech male stage actors
20th-century Czech male actors
Czech film directors
Silent film directors
People from České Budějovice District